The 2012 North Queensland Cowboys season was the 18th in the club's history. Coached by Neil Henry and co-captained by Johnathan Thurston and Matthew Scott, they competed in the National Rugby League's 2012 Telstra Premiership. They finished the regular season in 5th place and were knocked out in the second week of the finals by the Manly-Warringah Sea Eagles, for the second year in a row.

Season summary
The Cowboys were aiming to build on its 7th place finish in 2011, after a near-wooden spoon 2010 season only prevented by the Melbourne Storm salary cap breach, with a strong 2012 season.

The season did not start well, with the Cowboys producing one of their worst performances in almost ten years as they lost 18-0 to the Gold Coast Titans at home, with a completion rate of only 35%, the worst on record. In Round 2, the Cowboys defeated the Brisbane Broncos at Suncorp Stadium, with Matthew Bowen scoring the match-winning try on his 30th birthday.

Despite the opening loss, the Cowboys went on to produce a consistent, never once dropping out of the top eight from Round 3 onwards. They records big victories over the Parramatta Eels in Round 3 (42-6), the Sydney Roosters in Round 7 (50-12), the St George Illawarra Dragons in Round 9 (30-6), the Canberra Raiders in Round 16 (40-18) and the Warriors in Round 23 (52-12). They ended the regular season on four game winning streak, finishing in 5th place, their highest finish since 2007.

In Week 1 of the finals, the Cowboys defeated the Brisbane Broncos 33-16, with Michael Morgan scoring a hat-trick, the first halfback to do so in a finals game. It was their third win over Brisbane in 2012. A week later they were eliminated by Manly in controversial circumstances.

Club legend Aaron Payne announced his retirement at the end of the 2012 season, he became a life member at the club after playing his 200th game for the Cowboys. Earlier in the season, Matthew Bowen became the first player to play 250 NRL games for North Queensland.

Milestones
 Round 1: Kane Linnett and Robert Lui made their debuts for the club.
 Round 1: Mosese Pangai made his NRL debut.
 Round 6: Aaron Payne played his 200th game for the club.
 Round 6: Johnathan Thurston played his 150th game for the club.
 Round 6: Johnathan Thurston scored his 1000th point for the club.
 Round 8: Gavin Cooper played his 50th game for the club.
 Round 17: Anthony Mitchell made his debut for the club.
 Round 21: Dallas Johnson played his 200th NRL game.
 Round 25: Blake Leary made his NRL debut.
 Finals Week 1: Matthew Bowen played his 250th for the club, the first player to do so.
 Finals Week 2: Dallas Johnson played his 50th game for the club.

Squad List

Squad Movement

2012 Gains

2012 Losses

Ladder

Fixtures

Pre-season

Regular season

Finals

Statistics

Source:

Representatives
The following players have played a representative match in 2012

Honours

League
Dally M Five-Eighth of the Year: Johnathan Thurston
RLIF Five-Eighth of the Year: Johnathan Thurston
NRL Top Tryscorer: Ashley Graham
NYC Team of the Year: Chris Grevsmuhl

Club
Paul Bowman Medal: Johnathan Thurston
Player's Player: James Tamou
Club Person of the Year: Johnathan Thurston
Rookie of the Year: Jason Taumalolo
Most Improved: Kane Linnett
NYC Player of the Year: Zac Santo

Feeder Clubs

National Youth Competition
 North Queensland Cowboys - 13th, missed finals

Queensland Cup
 Mackay Cutters - 8th, missed finals
 Northern Pride - 7th, missed finals

References

North Queensland Cowboys seasons
North Queensland Cowboys season